"The Way He Makes Me Feel" is a popular song from 1983 performed by Barbra Streisand. The song is featured in the film adaptation of the play Yentl, in which Streisand starred and sang most of the music. The lyrics were written by Alan and Marilyn Bergman, with music by Michel Legrand.

Accolades
Along with another song from Yentl ("Papa, Can You Hear Me?"), "The Way He Makes Me Feel" was nominated for an Academy Award in the category Best Original Song. Both tunes lost the Oscar to "Flashdance...What a Feeling".

Weekly charts
"The Way He Makes Me Feel" was released as a single in a slightly different and more contemporary version than the one on the soundtrack to the film. It reached number 40 on the Billboard Hot 100 chart and spent two weeks at number one on the adult contemporary chart. This was Streisand's eighth (and, to date, final) number-one song on the Billboard adult contemporary chart.

See also
List of number-one adult contemporary singles of 1983 (U.S.)

References

1983 singles
Barbra Streisand songs
Songs written for films
Songs with lyrics by Alan Bergman
Songs with lyrics by Marilyn Bergman
Songs with music by Michel Legrand
Pop ballads
1983 songs
Columbia Records singles
Song recordings produced by Phil Ramone